The leopard seal (Hydrurga leptonyx), also referred to as the sea leopard, is the second largest species of seal in the Antarctic (after the southern elephant seal). Its only natural predator is the orca. It feeds on a wide range of prey including cephalopods, other pinnipeds, krill, fish, and birds, particularly penguins. It is the only species in the genus Hydrurga. Its closest relatives are the Ross seal, the crabeater seal and the Weddell seal, which together are known as the tribe of Lobodontini seals. The name hydrurga means "water worker" and leptonyx is the Greek for "thin-clawed".

Taxonomy
French zoologist Henri Marie Ducrotay de Blainville described the leopard seal in 1820.

Description

The leopard seal has a distinctively long and muscular body shape when compared to other seals, but it is perhaps best known for its massive jaws, which allow it to be one of the top predators in its environment. The front teeth are sharp like those of other carnivores, but their molars lock together in a way that allows them to sieve krill from the water in the manner of the crabeater seal. The coat is counter-shaded with a silver to dark gray blend and a distinctive spotted "leopard" coloration pattern dorsally and a paler, white to light gray color ventrally. Females are slightly larger than males. The whiskers are short and clear.

As "true" seals, they do not have external ears or pinnae, but possess an internal ear canal that leads to an external opening. Their hearing in air is similar to that of a human, but scientists have noted that leopard seals use their ears in conjunction with their whiskers to track prey under water.

Distribution

Leopard seals are pagophilic ("ice-loving") seals, which primarily inhabit the Antarctic pack ice between 50˚S and 80˚S.  Sightings of vagrant leopard seals have been recorded on the coasts of Australia, New Zealand (where individuals have been seen even on the foreshores of major cities such as Auckland, Dunedin and Wellington), South America, and South Africa. In August 2018, an individual was sighted at Geraldton, on the west coast of Australia. Higher densities of leopard seals are seen in the Western Antarctic than in other regions.

Most leopard seals remain within the pack ice throughout the year and remain solitary during most of their lives with the exception of a mother and her newborn pup. These matrilineal groups can move further north in the austral winter to sub-antarctic islands and the coastlines of the southern continents to provide care for their pups. While solitary animals may appear in areas of lower latitudes, females rarely breed there. Some researchers believe this is due to safety concerns for the pups. Lone male leopard seals hunt other marine mammals and penguins in the pack ice of antarctic waters. The estimated population of this species ranges from 220,000 to 440,000 individuals, putting leopard seals at "least concern". Although there is an abundance of leopard seals in the Antarctic, they are difficult to survey by traditional visual techniques because they spend long periods of time vocalizing under the water during the austral spring and summer, when visual surveys are carried out. The trait of vocalizing underwater for long periods means they can be the subject of acoustic surveys, allowing researchers to gather most of what is known about them.

Behavior

Acoustic behavior
Leopard seals are very vocal underwater during the austral summer.
The male seals produce loud calls (153 to 177 dB re 1 μPa at 1 m) for many hours each day. While singing the seal hangs upside down and rocks from side to side under the water. Their back is bent, the neck and cranial thoracic region (the chest) is inflated and as they call their chest pulses. The male calls can be split into two categories: vocalizing and silencing, in which vocalizing is when they are making noises underwater, and silencing noted as the breathing period at the air surface. Adult male leopard seals have only a few stylized calls, some are like bird or cricket-like trills yet others are low haunting moans. Scientists have identified five distinctive sounds that male leopard seals make, which include: the high double trill, medium single trill, low descending trill, low double trill, and a hoot with a single low trill. These cadence of calls are believed to be a part of a long range acoustic display for territorial purposes, or the attraction of a potential mate. 

The leopard seals have age-related differences in their calling patterns, just like birds. Where the younger male seals have many different types of variable calls – the adult male seals have only a few, highly stylized calls. Each male leopard seal produces these individual calls, and can arrange their few call types into individually distinctive sequences (or songs). The acoustic behavior of the leopard seal is believed to be linked to their breeding behaviour. In male seals, vocalizing coincides with the timing of their breeding season, which falls between November and the first week of January; captive female seals vocalize when they have elevated reproductive hormones. Conversely, a female leopard seal can attribute calls to their environment as well; however, usually it is to gain the attention of a pup, after getting back from a forage for food.

Breeding habits

Since leopard seals live in an area difficult for humans to survive in, not much is known on their reproduction and breeding habits. However, it is known that their breeding system is polygynous, meaning that males mate with multiple females during the mating period. A sexually active female (ages 3–7) can give birth to a single pup during the summer on the floating ice floes of the Antarctic pack ice, with a sexually active male (ages 6–7). Mating occurs from December to January, shortly after the pups are weaned when the female seal is in estrus. In preparation for the pups, the females dig a circular hole in the ice as a home for the pup. A newborn pup weighs around 66 pounds and are usually with their mother for a month, before they are weaned off. The male leopard seal does not participate in taking care of the pup, and goes back to its solitary lifestyle after the breeding season. Most leopard seal breeding is on pack ice.

Five research voyages were made to Antarctica in 1985, 1987 and 1997–1999 to look at leopard seals. They sighted seal pups from the beginning of November to the end of December, and noticed that there was about one pup for every three adults, and they also noticed that most of the adults were staying away from other adults during this season, and when they were seen in groups they showed no sign of interaction. Leopard seal pups mortality rate within the first year is close to 25%.

Vocalization is thought to be important in breeding, since males are much more vocal around this time. Mating takes place in the water, and then the male leaves the female to care for the pup, which the female gives birth to after an average gestation period of 274 days.

Research shows that on average, the aerobic dive limit for juvenile seals is around 7 minutes, which means that during the winter months juvenile leopard seals do not eat krill, which is a major part of older seals' diets, since krill is found deeper during this time. This might occasionally lead to co-operative hunting. Co-operative hunting of leopard seals on Antarctic fur seal pups has been witnessed, which could be a mother helping her older pup, or could also be female-male couple interactions, to increase their hunting productivity.

Foraging behavior
 

The only natural predator of leopard seals is the orca. It feeds on a wide variety of creatures. Young leopard seals usually eat mostly krill, squid and fish. Adult seals probably switch from krill to more substantial prey, including king, Adélie, rockhopper, gentoo, emperor and chinstrap penguins, and less frequently, Weddell, crabeater, Ross, and young southern elephant seals. Leopard seals are also known to take fur seal pups.

Around the sub-Antarctic island of South Georgia, the Antarctic fur seal (Arctocephalus gazella) is the main prey. Other prey include penguins and fish including chondrichthyans. Antarctic krill (Euphausia superba), southern elephant seal (Mirounga leonina) pups and seabirds other than penguins have also been taken as prey.

When hunting penguins, the leopard seal patrols the waters near the edges of the ice, almost completely submerged, waiting for the birds to enter the ocean. It kills the swimming bird by grabbing the feet, then shaking the penguin vigorously and beating its body against the surface of the water repeatedly until the penguin is dead. Previous reports stating the leopard seal skins its prey before feeding have been found to be incorrect. Lacking the teeth necessary to slice its prey into manageable pieces, it flails its prey from side to side tearing and ripping it into smaller pieces. Krill meanwhile, is eaten by suction, and strained through the seal's teeth, allowing leopard seals to switch to different feeding styles. Such generalization and adaptations may be responsible for the seal's success in the challenging Antarctic ecosystem.

Physiology and research 
Leopard seals' heads and front flippers are extremely large in comparison to other phocids. Their large front flippers are used to steer themselves through the water column making them extremely agile while hunting. They use their front flippers similarly to sea lions (otariids) and leopard seal females are larger than males. They are covered in a thick layer of blubber that helps to keep them warm while in the cold temperatures of the Antarctic. This layer of blubber also helps to streamline their body making them more hydrodynamic. This is essential when hunting small prey items such as penguins because speed is necessary. Scientists take blubber thickness, girth, weight, and length measurements of leopard seals to learn about their average weight, health, and population as a whole. These measurements are then used to calculate their energetics which is the amount of energy and food it takes for them to survive as a species. They also have incredible diving capabilities. This information can be obtained by scientists by attaching transmitters to the seals after they are tranquilized on the ice. These devices are called satellite-linked time depth recorders (SLDRs) and time-depth recorders (TDRs). Scientists attach this device usually to the head of the animal and it records depth, bottom time, total dive time, date and time, surface time, haul out time, pitch and roll, and total number of dives. This information is sent to a satellite where scientists from anywhere in the world can collect the data. This is how we are currently learning so much about leopard seals diet and foraging habits. With this information we are able to calculate and better understand their diving physiology. They are primarily shallow divers but they do dive deeper than 80 meters in search for food. They are able to complete these dives by collapsing their lungs and re-inflating them at the surface. This is possible by increasing surfactant which coats the alveoli in the lungs for re-inflation. They also have a reinforced trachea to prevent collapse at great depth pressures.

Relationships with humans

Leopard seals are large predators presenting a potential risk to humans. However, attacks on humans are rare. Most human perceptions of leopard seals are shaped by historic encounters between humans and leopard seals that occurred during the early days of Antarctic exploration.

Negative interactions with humans

Examples of aggressive behaviour, stalking and attacks are rare, but have been documented. Notable incidents include:
 A large leopard seal attacked Thomas Orde-Lees (1877–1958), a member of Sir Ernest Shackleton's Imperial Trans-Antarctic Expedition of 1914–1917, when the expedition was camping on the sea ice. He was saved only when another member of the expedition, Frank Wild, shot the animal.
 In 1985, Canadian-British explorer Gareth Wood was bitten twice on the leg when a leopard seal tried to drag him off the ice and into the sea. His companions managed to save him by repeatedly kicking the animal in the head with the spiked crampons on their boots.
On 26 September 2021, near the dive site Spaniard Rock at Simon's Town, South Africa, three spear-fisherman encountered a leopard seal while spearing approximately 400 m offshore. The seal attacked them and, while they were swimming back to shore, disarmed them of their flippers and spearguns and kept harassing the men over the course of half an hour, inflicting multiple bite and puncture wounds.

Fatal interactions
In 2003, biologist Kirsty Brown of the British Antarctic Survey was killed by a leopard seal while snorkeling in Antarctica. This was the first recorded human fatality from a leopard seal. Brown was part of a team of four researchers taking part in an underwater survey at South Cove near the U.K.'s Rothera Research Station. Brown and another researcher, Richard Burt, were snorkeling in the water. Burt was snorkeling 15 meters away when the team heard a scream and saw Brown disappear into the water. She was quickly rescued by her team but they were  unable to resuscitate her. It was later revealed that the seal had held her underwater for six minutes at a depth of up to 70 meters. She suffered a total of 45 separate injuries most of which were concentrated around her head and neck. As she was snorkeling at the time she may have seen the seal approaching her.

In a report read at the inquiry into Brown's death, Professor Ian Boyd from St. Andrews University stated that the seal may have mistaken her for a fur seal or may have been frightened by her presence and attacked in defense. Professor Boyd claimed that leopard seal attacks on humans were extremely rare but warned that they may potentially become more common due to increased human presence in Antarctica. The coroner recorded a verdict of an accidental death caused by drowning due to a leopard seal attack.

Interactions with human property
Leopard seals have shown a predilection for attacking the black, torpedo-shaped pontoons of rigid inflatable boats, leading researchers to equip their craft with special protective guards to prevent them from being punctured.

Positive interactions with humans
Paul Nicklen, a National Geographic magazine photographer, captured pictures of a leopard seal bringing live, injured, and then dead penguins to him, possibly in an attempt to teach the photographer how to hunt.

Conservation 
From a conservation standpoint, the only known predators of the leopard seals are killer whales and sharks. Because of their limited subpolar distribution in the Antarctic, they may be at risk as polar ice caps diminish with global warming. In the wild, leopard seals can live up to 26 years old. Leopard seal hunting is regulated by the Antarctic Treaty and the Convention for the Conservation of Antarctic Seals (CCAS).

Notes and references

General references

 Heacox, Kim. (2006). Deadly Beauty. National Geographic, November 2006
 Saundry, Peter. (2010) Leopard Seal. Encyclopedia of Earth. Topic ed. C. Michael Hogan, editor-in-chief Cutler Cleveland, NCSE, Washington DC

External links

Best Wildlife Photos of 2005 – "Underwater World" Winner: "Leopard Seal Pass"
"Face-off with a deadly predator" (video); National Geographic photo assignment
Voices in the Sea – the Leopard Seal (audio)

Lobodontins
Pinnipeds of Antarctica
Pinnipeds of South America
Pinnipeds of Australia
Mammals of Chile
Mammals of South Australia
Carnivorans of South America
Fauna of Heard Island and McDonald Islands
Least concern biota of Oceania
Least concern biota of South America
Mammals described in 1820
Extant Zanclean first appearances
Pliocene mammals of South America
Pliocene pinnipeds
Taxa named by Henri Marie Ducrotay de Blainville